Cape Grim, officially Kennaook / Cape Grim, is the northwestern point of Tasmania, Australia. The Peerapper name for the cape is recorded as Kennaook.

It is the location of the Cape Grim Baseline Air Pollution Station and of the Cape Grim Air Archive which is operated by the Australian Bureau of Meteorology in a joint programme with the CSIRO. The station was established in 1976 and has been operating ever since.

Geography
Cape Grim's isolated geographic location makes it unique. The next land mass directly west of Cape Grim is not Africa, but the southern tip of Argentina. Winds that make their way to Cape Grim from Antarctica and the Indian Ocean hit no significant land mass. Air pollution values collected at Cape Grim are the closest attainable representation of a global average.

History

The headland was first charted and named Cape Grim by Matthew Flinders on 7 December 1798, as he sailed from the east in the Norfolk and found a long swell coming from the south-west, confirming for the first time that Van Diemen's Land was separated from the Australian mainland by a strait, which he named Bass Strait.

In 1828, Victory Hill at Cape Grim was the site of the Cape Grim massacre of thirty Peerapper people by four shepherds.

Cape Grim received dual naming in March 2021.

See also
Woolnorth Wind Farm

References

North West Coast of Tasmania